Oliver Bascom (June 13, 1815 – November 7, 1869) was an American businessman and politician from New York.

Life
He was born in West Haven, Rutland County, Vermont, the son of Josiah Bascom (1786–1863) and Betsey (Bottom) Bascom. The family removed to Whitehall, Washington County, New York, in 1824. He entered the transportation and forwarding business as a clerk, and in 1841 opened his own company. On January 4, 1842, he married Almira Tanner (born 1822), and they had seven children. In 1851, he formed a partnership, Bascom, Vaughan & Co., which later became the Northern Transportation Line. In 1862, he retired from this company, and went to California. Upon his return a short time later, he engaged in farming and the lumber business.

He was Supervisor of the Town of Whitehall in 1851, 1852, 1864 and 1865.

In November 1868, he was elected on the Democratic ticket as a Canal Commissioner, and took office on January 1, 1869.

He died ten months into his term.

Sources
Biographical Sketches of John T. Hoffman and Allen C. Beach (pages 106f)
The Fitch Gazetteer: An Annotated Index to the Manuscript History of Washington County, New York by Kenneth A. Perry (Heritage Books, 1999)
The Late Canal Commissioner Bascom in NYT on November 9, 1869
History of Washington Co., New York by Crisfield Johnson (1878; pg. 475 and 491)

1815 births
1869 deaths
People from Whitehall, New York
Erie Canal Commissioners
People from West Haven, Vermont
New York (state) Democrats
Town supervisors in New York (state)
19th-century American politicians